Brachysphaenus is a genus of Pleasing Fungus Beetles in the family Erotylidae.

References

Erotylidae
Cucujoidea genera